The women's sprint competition at the 2010 Asian Games was held from 14 to 17 November at the Guangzhou Velodrome.

Schedule
All times are China Standard Time (UTC+08:00)

Records

Results
Legend
DNF — Did not finish
REL — Relegated

Qualifying

1/8 finals

Heat 1

Heat 2

Heat 3

Heat 4

Heat 5

Heat 6

Repechages 1/8

Heat 1

Heat 2

Quarterfinals

Heat 1

Heat 2

Heat 3

Heat 4

Race 5th–8th

Semifinals

Heat 1

Heat 2

Finals

Bronze

Gold

Final standing

References

External links 
Results

Track Women sprint